The 2014–15 Radford Highlanders men's basketball team represented Radford University during the 2014–15 NCAA Division I men's basketball season. The Highlanders, led by fourth year head coach Mike Jones, played their home games at the Dedmon Center and were members of the Big South Conference. They finished the season 22–12, 12–6 in Big South play to finish in a three way tie for third place. They lost in the quarterfinals of the Big South tournament to Winthrop. They were invited to the College Basketball Invitational where they Delaware State in the first round before losing in the quarterfinals to Vermont.

Roster

Schedule
Source:

|-
!colspan=9 style="background:#ff0000; color:#ffffff;"| Regular season

|-
!colspan=9 style="background:#ff0000; color:#ffffff;"|Big South tournament

|-
!colspan=9 style="background:#ff0000; color:#ffffff;"|College Basketball Invitational

References 

Radford Highlanders men's basketball seasons
Radford
George Mason Virginia
George Mason Virginia
Radford